Tylopilus veluticeps is a bolete fungus in the family Boletaceae found in Singapore. Originally described as a species of Boletus by Narcisse Théophile Patouillard and Charles Fuller Baker in 1918, it was transferred to Tylopilus in 1947 by Rolf Singer. The elliptical spores are 12–15 by 4 µm.

References

External links

veluticeps
Fungi described in 1918
Fungi of Asia